This is the discography of Thai singer Tata Young. In her native country Thailand, she has sold over 1 million units albums. Her expanded discography consists of nine studio albums since 1995, having released three albums in English, eleven compilation albums, two extended plays, one soundtrack and 34 singles.

Albums

Studio albums

Compilation albums

Soundtrack albums

Extended plays

Singles

Pop music discographies
Discographies of Thai artists